Ion Aramendi Urrestarazu (born 11 February 1977) is a Spanish journalist, television presenter and former basketball player.

Biography
Born in San Sebastián in the Basque Country, Aramendi moved to Salamanca in Castile and León in 1996 to play basketball for CB Tormes and CB Avenida. During his time there, he also studied Journalism at the Pontifical University of Salamanca. In 2002, he returned home to play for Santurtzi CB.

He began in television in 2009 as a reporter on the tabloid television programme Sálvame on Telecinco. In 2016, he moved to ETB 2 in his native region to present the current affairs programme ¡Qué me estás contando!, as well as New Year's Eve programmes on EITB.

In December 2019, Aramendi returned to national television as the host of El cazador on La 1, the Spanish adaptation of the British game show The Chase. In March and April of the following year, he presented Todos en casa, a variety show at the start of the COVID-19 lockdown. It was broadcast from his home, with his family.

In February 2021, Aramendi was announced as the co-presenter of The Dancer with Sandra Cervera, an adaptation of The Greatest Dancer on La 1.

In 2022, Aramendi returned to Telecinco to present the debate show of Survivor Spain. In November 2022, Aramendi was announced as the presenter of Reacción en cadena, the Spanish adaptation of the American game show Chain Reaction.

Personal life
Aramendi married María in Salamanca in 2011. As of 2020, they had two sons. He is the third of four brothers, who were all teammates at CB Avenida in 2000–01.

References

1977 births
Living people
Sportspeople from San Sebastián
Spanish men's basketball players
Pontifical University of Salamanca alumni
Basque journalists
Spanish television journalists
Spanish television presenters
Spanish game show hosts
Basketball players from the Basque Country (autonomous community)